Although he was a proficient organist, Anton Bruckner left few compositions for the organ. 

Bruckner has mainly made his name because of his organ playing during his journeys to Nancy, Paris, London and the states of imperial Austria. His celebrity as organist was mainly based on his improvisation skill. The compositions Bruckner left for the organ are of secondary significance in his portfolio. With the exception of the later Perger Präludium with its romantic chromaticism, the few organ works date from his earlier lifetime and are mainly based on the baroque tradition.

Compositions 

Only five pieces and two sketches are indubitably autograph compositions:
The manuscript with this and the following work is stored in the archive of the St. Florian Abbey – , Band XII/6, No. 1 
 Andante in D minor, WAB 126/2 - a prelude composed also in  – , Band XII/6, No. 2
 Vorspiel und Fuge in C minor, WAB 131 - a prelude and fugue composed on 15 March 1847. The incomplete manuscript, which is stored in the archive of the Seitenstetten Abbey, was first published in Band II/2, pp. 78–82 of the Göllerich/Auer biography. The incomplete score was completed by Franz Phillip in 1929 – , Band XII/6 No. 3
 Fuge in D minor, WAB 125 - a fugue composed by Bruckner on 7 November 1861 for an examination, which he wanted to have in Vienna on 19 November 1861. The sketch is stored in the Österreichische Nationalbibliothek.
 Präludium (Perger Präludium) in C major, WAB 129 - a prelude composed in 1884. A sketch is stored in the archive of the Kremsmünster Abbey.
 Improvisationskizze Ischl 1890, WAB 240 - themes for improvisation sketched by Bruckner in July 1890 for organ playing during the wedding of Archduchess Marie Valerie of Austria with Archduke Franz Salvator in Bad Ischl on 30 July 1890. The sketch combines two themes from the finale of Symphony No. 1, which Bruckner was reviewing at that time, the fugato from Händel's Hallelujah and the Kaiserhymne.In 1990 Erwin Horn made an improvisation based on the two themes from the finale of Symphony No. 1 as Improvisationskizze Bad Ischl and issued a score of his improvisation. This improvisation was later recorded again by Klaus Sonnleitner, Siegfried Petri (2009) and Gerd Schaller (2015).In 2007 Horn made a second improvisation based on the four themes of the sketch as Kaiserliche Festmusik.
 Konzertskizze in C minor, WAB 241 -  Three themes for an organ improvisation on 28 August 1884 in Kremsmünster. 

In addition:
It is a first draft for the main theme of the Adagio of the Symphony No. 9 – , Band XII/6, No. 7
Doubts have been cast on their authenticity. They are presumably copies of compositions by Johan Baptist Weiß or another organist – , Band XII/6, No. 8 (Addendum).
 Twenty-two other organ pieces found in Bruckner's Präludienbuch  (WAB 334) are presumably also transcriptions of works of Johann Baptist Weiß or other composers. These pieces were edited by Louis Dité in: Vademecum für Organisten, Verlag Weinberger, Vienna, London, 1947.

Selected discography 
A few "complete editions" of the organ works have been released on LP or CD. Even if one includes the "apocryphal" preludes WAB 127 and 128, the playing time only slightly exceeds half an hour: 33 minutes for Horn, 26 minutes for Schaller, who does not include these preludes. In addition to the five preludes WAB 127 and WAB 128 - all in E-flat major - there are other short organ works, that are assigned to Bruckner in obscure collections. Franz Haselböck has recorded some of them on harmonium - very interesting as a curiosity, but unfortunately they were not released on CD. With all the necessary critical restraint, a collection of such curiosities would be desired.
 Franz Haselböck, Brucknerorgel der Piaristenkirche Wien, 19th-Century Austrian Organ Music: Anton Bruckner Complete Works for Organ / Simon Sechter Selected Organ Works – LP: Musical Heritage Society MHS 1972
 Augustinus Franz Kropfreiter, Bruckner-Orgel (St. Florian Monastery), Verein der Freunde der Oberösterreichischen Stiftskonzerte – LP: ORF/Lesborne L 2955, .A digitalisation of the LP can be heard on John Berky's website: Organ works by Augustinus Franz Kropfreiter (items 5 to 9)
 Heinz Lohmann, Klais-Orgel of the Jesuit Church, Mannheim - LP: RBM 3004, 1974; reissued as CD: Klassic Haus KHCD 2012-008, 2011  
 Erwin Horn, Klais-Orgel of the Frauenkirche, Nuremberg, Bruckner Orgelwerke – CD: Novalis 150 071-2, 1990 - with the Improvisationskizze Bad Ischl (improvisation on the finale of Symphony No. 1)
 Erwin Horn, Bruckner-Orgel (Sankt Florian), Was mir die Liebe erzählt - CD: MOT 13551, 2007 - with the Kaiserliche Festmusik (improvisation on the four themes of the sketch)
 Klaus Sonnleitner, Kaleidoskop - Die Brucknerorgel in St. Florian - CD: Spektral SRL4-12107, 2011  (except the preludes WAB 127 & 128)
 Gerd Schaller, Eisenbarth-organ of the Church of the Ebrach Abbey, Bruckner – Mass 3, Psalm 146, Organ works – CD: Profil Hänssler PH16034, 2015 (except the preludes WAB 127 & 128)

A complete recording of the pieces from the Bruckner Präludienbuch  by AMuSicScoRe can be heard on YouTube:
 Cadence in D major, WAB 334/1 - Cadence in D major, WAB 334/2 - Moderato in D major, WAB 334/3  
  Lento in E-flat major, WAB 334/4 - Con moto in E-flat major, WAB 334/5 - Cadence in E major, WAB 334/6
 Langsam in E minor, WAB 334/7 - Cadence in F major, WAB 334/8 -  Moderato in F major, WAB 334/9
 Andante in F major, WAB 334/10 - Cadence in G-Dur, WAB 334/11 - Allegro in G major, WAB 334/12
 Cadence in G minor, WAB 334/13 - Cadence in G minor, WAB 334/14 - Verse in G minor, WAB 334/15
  Mit starken Stimmen in A flat major, WAB 334/16 - Cadences in A flat major, WAB 334/17 & 334/18 - Andante in A major, WAB 333/19
  Sine nomine in A major, WAB 334/20 - Moderato in B-flat major, WAB 334/21 - Andante in B-flat major, WAB 334/22

Note: a transcription in D-flat major of the Andante in F major, WAB 334/10, is a popular piece by horn quartets.

References

Sources 
  August Göllerich, Anton Bruckner. Ein Lebens- und Schaffens-Bild,  – posthumous edited by Max Auer by G. Bosse, Regensburg, 1932
 Uwe Harten, Anton Bruckner. Ein Handbuch. , Salzburg, 1996. .
 Anton Bruckner – Sämtliche Werke, Band XII/6: Organ works (1846–1890), Musikwissenschaftlicher Verlag der Internationalen Bruckner-Gesellschaft, Erwin Horn (Editor), Vienna, 1998
 Cornelis van Zwol, Anton Bruckner 1824–1896 – Leven en werken, uitg. Thoth, Bussum, Netherlands, 2012. 
 Crawford Howie, Anton Bruckner - A documentary biography, online revised edition

External links 
 
 Scores of organ preludes on John Berky's website
 Werke für Orgel Critical discography by Hans Roelofs 

Bruckner, Anton